Peter Sime Douty (26 October 1903, in Leeds, England – 18 July 1948, in Newton Abbot, Devon) was a Scottish rugby union player.

He also went on the 1927 British Lions tour to Argentina.

References

1903 births
1948 deaths
British & Irish Lions rugby union players from Scotland
Rugby union players from Leeds
Scotland international rugby union players
Scottish rugby union players
Rugby union scrum-halves